The following lists events that happened during 2005 in Chile.

Incumbents
President of Chile: Ricardo Lagos

Events

May
18 May – Tragedy of Antuco

December
11 December 
Chilean parliamentary election, 2005
2005–06 Chilean presidential election

Deaths
3 January – Misael Escuti (b. 1926)
6 March – Gladys Marín (b. 1938)
18 August – Andrónico Luksic Abaroa (b. 1926)
29 October – Fernando Alegría (b. 1918)

References 

 
Years of the 21st century in Chile
Chile